Mali Khedi is a village in the Bhopal district of Madhya Pradesh, India. It is located in the Huzur tehsil and the Phanda block. The Jagran Lakecity University is located near the village.

Demographics 

According to the 2011 census of India, Mali Khedi has 148 households. The effective literacy rate (i.e. the literacy rate of population excluding children aged 6 and below) is 61.33%.

References 

Villages in Huzur tehsil